Return to Fantasy is the eighth studio album by British rock band Uriah Heep, released on 13 June 1975 in the United Kingdom by Bronze Records. It was the first of the two albums to feature John Wetton as the new bass player, who replaced Gary Thain in early 1975.

The sleeve-art is by British artist Dave Field.

Reception

Return to Fantasy "retains the musical experimentation that marked Sweet Freedom and Wonderworld, but has an overall harder-rocking feel that makes it more consistent than either one of those albums", said Donald A. Guarisco in his retrospective AllMusic review. He criticized some of the album's "genre-hopping", and concluded, "In the end, Return to Fantasy lacks the coherence of a top-shelf Uriah Heep classic like Demons and Wizards but remains a strong and likable album that is guaranteed to please the group's fans". The review by Canadian journalist Martin Popoff was very critical of the album's recording "dominated by blaring but thin organ and sloppy drumming" and of Byron's "distant and unsure" performance, judging the album "completely adrift without a trace of spark".

Track listing

Personnel
Uriah Heep
 David Byron – lead vocals
 Mick Box – guitars
 Ken Hensley – keyboards, guitars, synthesizer, backing vocals
 Lee Kerslake – drums, percussion, backing vocals
 John Wetton – bass, Mellotron, backing vocals

Production
 Gerry Bron – producer
 Peter Gallen – engineer
 Dave Burns, Dave Harris – assistant engineers
 Harry Moss – mastering engineer at EMI Abbey Road Studios, London
 Dave Field – illustration
 Joe Gaffney – photography

Charts

Album

Weekly charts

Year-end charts

Singles

Certifications

References

Uriah Heep (band) albums
1975 albums
Albums recorded at Morgan Sound Studios
Warner Records albums
Bronze Records albums
Albums produced by Gerry Bron